Buccellati Holding Italia is an Italian jewellery and watch company formed by the merger of two previous companies with existing brands Mario Buccellati and Gianmaria Buccellati, which corresponded to the names and surname of two master goldsmiths, who were father and son.

History 
In 1919, Mario Buccellati opened his first enterprise and, after the establishment of stores in Milan, Rome and Florence, began the development of his overseas business by opening a new store on Fifth Avenue in New York in 1954 and another in Worth Avenue in Palm Beach, Florida in 1958. In 1949, Mario Buccellati was commissioned to create an icon by Pope Pius XII for Princess Margaret to mark the extraordinary power of the first visit of a British Royal to Vatican City in hundreds of years. This magnificent work of art can be admired today  at the Chianciano Art Museum in Tuscany.

In 1965, after the death of Mario, the management of the firm was conducted by four of his five sons. In 1971, the new brand Gianmaria Buccellati was launched by one of Mario's sons, who started a separate business from his brothers, and in 2011 came to an agreement with his relatives for the brand Buccellati, then Buccellati Holding Italia, reshaping the company.

In December 2016, China's Gansu Gangtai Holding Group bought a controlling 85% share in Buccellati.

In September 2019, Compagnie Financière Richemont acquired 100% of Buccellati from Gangtai. In the same year, the Maison celebrated its hundredth anniversary since its foundation that took place in 1919 with the opening of the first boutique in Milan, Largo Santa Margherita, next to the famous La Scala Theatre. The acquisition did not have an impact on Richemont's operating results in that fiscal year.

Expansion 
Gianmaria set up shops in Paris on Place Vendome, London, Moscow, Tokyo, Osaka, Nagoya, Hong Kong, Milan via Monte Napoleone, Costa Smeralda, Capri, Elba, Beverly Hills in Rodeo Drive, Aspen and Sydney; Gianmaria has been given several awards for his work as a goldsmith and entrepreneur. In 2011, after the trade association of the brands family, the company began to explore new markets. In 2013, the investment fund Clessidra took over the majority of the company's capital to further expand the business through owned shops showing only the label Buccellati.

Bibliography
Heritage Fine Jewelry & Timepieces by Jill Burgum, Katie Pierce Johnston and James L. Halperin 
Sylvia Luzzatto, Buccellati: arte senza tempo, 5 Continents Editions, 2008  
Martina Corgnati, Mario Buccellati: Prince of Goldsmiths, Rizzoli International Publications, Incorporated, 1999; 
Martina Corgnati, Mario Buccellati: storie di uomini e gioielli, Leonardo Arte, 1998 
Vincent-Emmanuel Ragot, Buccellati, Perseus Distribution Services, 2003 
Maria Cristina Buccellati, Buccellati: arte in oro, argento e gemme, Skira, 2000 
M. Mosco, Art of jewelry and artists' jewels in the 20th century, Giunti, 2001, pp. 20–21 and 168-179
M. Amari, I musei delle aziende, FrancoAngeli, 2001, pp. 239–242
A. Mazzuca, I numeri uno del made in Italy, Baldini Castoldi Dalai, 2005, pp. 66–67
A. Testa, M. Garbuglia, Profilo Italia: Un Certo Stile Made in Italy, Berenice, 1990, pp. 150–153 
M. Di Lorenzo, "Da Roma a New York l'impero del Principe dei gioiellieri", in Il Parlamento italiano, VII (1959), n. 3–4, pp. 42 ss.; 
R. Bossaglia, "I gioielli di Gabriele D'Annunzio", in Bolaffi Arte, November 1977, n. 74, suppl., pp. 40–47

Notes

External links 
 
 webencyclopedia
Macklowe Gallery

Companies based in Milan
Jewellery companies of Italy
Jewellery retailers of Italy
Watch manufacturing companies of Italy
Luxury brands
2016 mergers and acquisitions